Ingmar Zeisberg (born 17 February 1933) is a German actress. She appeared in more than thirty films since 1954.

Selected filmography

References

External links 

1933 births
Living people
German film actresses
20th-century German actresses